A self-service laundry, coin laundry, or coin wash, is a facility where clothes are washed and dried without much personalized professional help. They are known in the United Kingdom as launderettes or laundrettes, and in the United States, Canada, Australia and New Zealand as laundromats. In Texas and other parts of the south central United States, the term washateria is still used by some older speakers.

Overview
While most homes have their own washers and dryers, self-service laundries are used by many who do not have their own machines. Even those who have their own machines sometimes use them for large bedding and other items that cannot fit into residential washers and dryers.

Staffed laundries 

Laundromats are an essential business in urban communities. Laundromat owners may employ someone to oversee and maintain the general laundromat throughout the day. Some laundries employ staff to provide service for the customers. Minimal service centres may simply provide an attendant behind a counter to provide change, sell laundry detergent, and watch unattended machines for potential theft of clothing. If the business is big enough, the owner may employ a plumber to constantly maintain the machines and other workings.

Others allow customers to drop off clothing to be washed, dried, and folded. This is often referred to as fluff & fold, wash-n-fold, drop off, bachelor bundles, a service wash or full-service wash. Some staffed laundry facilities also provide dry cleaning pick-up and drop-off. There are over 35,000 laundries throughout the United States. Similar services exist in the United Kingdom where the terms service wash or full-service wash are also in use. The evolution of self-serve laundry services have been seen in some "fluff and fold" (also styled fluff n fold, fluff & fold, fluff 'n' fold, and fluff 'n fold) services provided by various laundromats.  These services provide the end user with washing, drying, and folding services on a per pound basis.  Some services offer free pickup and delivery, as well as complimentary laundry bags as part of their customer appreciation.  Additionally, dry-cleaning services have been known to utilize the pickup and delivery as a means to help generate additional revenue.

On-premise laundromats 
On-premise laundromats are found in locations such as hospitals, student residences at universities, or apartment blocks. Facility managers/maintenance staff work directly with machine distributors to supply and maintain washers and dryers. Use of the machines are primarily reserved for the residents of these facilities.

Many building owners use on-premise laundromats as a way to increase revenue. They can do this through renting their laundry room to laundry companies for a fixed monthly price allowing the laundry company to keep all revenue from the machines. Building owners also have the option to create a revenue sharing system where the apartment owner and laundry company split the profits from the machines each month.

By country

Australia 

In Australia, self service laundries are widely available and in use by a good percentage of the population. Due to its mild weather, Australia has a much smaller percentage of dryer owners, as the mild weather allows for hanging laundry outside for most of the year, with the exception of a few months. The brief Australian winter sees a surge in the usage of drying machines, usually easily found in self service laundries.

Israel 

In Israel, self service laundries are available and popular mainly in Tel Aviv, where there is a large network of laundromats.

New Zealand 

In New Zealand self-service laundries (known locally as laundromats) are available, but not widely used. Historically, most houses in New Zealand have had their own laundry rooms for clothes washing. In recent decades the number of people living in smaller flats and apartments has increased, and so too has the availability and use of laundromats, especially in larger cities such as Auckland and Wellington.

United Kingdom 
The first UK launderette (alternative spelling: laundrette) was opened on 9 May 1949 in Queensway (London). UK launderettes are mainly fully automated and coin-operated, and are either staffed or unstaffed. Some may be staffed during fewer hours than the operating time each week. They are generally found only in urban and suburban areas, and have been common features of urban life since the 1960s. In the last two decades there has been a decline in the number of launderettes in the United Kingdom; only approximately 3000 remain.

Rapidly rising utility charges, premises rent and a lower purchase cost of domestic machines have been noted as principal reasons for the recent decline. High initial launch costs, specifically for commercial washing machines and dryers, have also been commented on as reasons for fewer new entrants into the market. Furthermore, machine updates can be prohibitively expensive, which has held back premises investment.

Many of the staffed operations in the UK have added value services such as ironing, dry cleaning and service washes, which prove popular to busy professionals, students, and senior citizens. Student accommodation blocks often have their own unstaffed laundries, which are typically commercially run at a profit by the accommodation provider.

Local directories, such as the yellow pages and Thomson, only show those laundries that have chosen to pay for an entry in their directories, so trends are difficult to assess. However, large cities such as Birmingham, Bristol, Leeds, Liverpool, London, Manchester, Sheffield and Southampton have significant numbers of launderettes, as do many coastal tourist areas.

The main manufacturers serving the UK in this market are Electrolux, IPSO, Maytag, and Primus. Brands such as Frigidaire and Speed Queen are also regularly deployed, with most originating from Belgium and the US.

Whilst the future of launderettes in the UK is not assured, domestic machine users experiencing breakdowns in the home, users of large bedding, and tourists are potential customers, thereby making the provision valuable to the community.

United States

Self-service laundry facilities in the United States are most commonly called laundromats. The term "laundromat" is the genericized trademark of the Westinghouse Electric Corporation) and was created by its employee, George Edward Pendray. "Washateria" is an alternate name for laundromat, but is not in common use outside of Texas. The term comes from the first laundromat in the United States, which was known as a washateria and was opened on 18 April 1934 in Fort Worth, Texas, by C.A. Tannahill. Though steam-powered laundry machines were invented in the 19th century, their cost put them out of reach of many. Cantrell and others began renting short-term use of their machines. Most laundromats in the US are fully automated and coin-operated and generally unstaffed, with many operating 24 hours a day. The invention of the coin-operated laundry machine is ascribed to Harry Greenwald of New York who created Greenwald Industries in 1957; the company marketed the devices through the 20th century. While coin laundromats are very common, some laundromats accept credit cards or provide their own card system.

The United States Census Bureau estimates that there are 11,000 of this style of laundromat in the US, employing 39,000 people and generating over $3.4 billion every year.

In popular culture 

 My Beautiful Laundrette, 1985 film
 My Beautiful Laundrette, 2019 play

See also
 Laundress or washerwoman, who used to do similar work
 Mangle (machine)

References

External links 

 Coin Laundry Association, a not-for-profit trade organization for the self-service laundry industry

Laundry places
Cleaning industry